Keith Lowe may refer to:

 Keith Lowe (author) (born 1970), English writer
 Keith Lowe (footballer) (born 1985), English footballer
 Keith Lowe (musician), bass player on The Willies etc.